Ferenc Deák (16 January 1922 – 18 April 1998) was a Hungarian footballer who played as a striker for clubs such as Szentlőrinci AC, Ferencváros and Budapesti Dózsa, and who played internationally for Hungary, scoring 29 goals in just 20 caps. His nickname was Bamba. With over 795 goals in official matches scored during his career, the bulk of which came during WWII, Deák is the seventh top goalscorer of all time.

Early life
He was born on 16 January 1922 in Ferencváros, Budapest. Deák, who also worked in his family's bakery, began his career as a goalkeeper at the age of thirteen, but his parents banned him from football when a shot hit him in the head and he lost consciousness. However, outside the field, his talent to strike a ball skilfully, powerfully and accurately was quickly noticed by a coach who was searching for talent, and that coach subsequently managed to convince his parents that the boy could continue playing, but they made a condition: he could no longer stand in between the posts.

Club career
Deák continued his footballing career now as a striker, and he got off to a very good start as he scored six goals in his senior debut in 1940 in his place of residence, Pestszentlőrinc, playing for one of the local teams, Szentlőrinci AC, in the third division, and he was pivotal in helping the club to reach the top-flight in 1944. He then topped the European top scoring list three times, in the 1945-46(66), 1946-47(48) and 1948-49(59) seasons. His best season was the 1945/46 league season, when he scored 66 goals in 34 matches, and because of it, he was voted the Hungarian Player of the Year. He still holds the record for the most goals scored in a single European league season with 66 (endorsed by the IFFHS). In absolute terms, only American Archibald Stark did better with 67 goals in the 1924/25 season, but he needed 44 matches to reach that figure. Because of these impressive numbers he was eventually signed by Ferencváros in 1947, and he played for them as a center-forward for three years, from 1947 to 1950, winning the Hungarian championship at the end of the 1948/49 season. In this league season, the attackers of the team celebrated the half-century anniversary of the club's formation (Ferencváros was founded in 1899) with 140 goals in just 30 matches, of which Deák himself contributed with 59 hits. He scored 155 goals in 111 matches (121 in 83 matches in the league only) over three years in green and white.

Deák got the nickname "Bamba" from the fans because, as he later recalled in a report,

After three years (1947–50) at Ferencváros, he then moved to rival's Újpest (politics played a role in the move), and during his four years with the purple-whites, he did not stop scoring there either, scoring 53 goals in 77 matches. He spent the last years of his playing career at Spartacus Budapest, VM Egyetértés and Siófok.
The "goalkeeper" Deák has a total of 303 league goals, winning three Hungarian League titles, and in 1997 he was awarded the title of goal king of the century in Munich.

In 1999 (posthumously) he received the Hungarian Heritage Award and became an honorary citizen of Pestszentimre-Pestszentlőrinc. Ferenc Deák is remembered for the goblet, which is handed over to the top scorer of the top championship every year, and a wandering cup has also been named after him. In 2007 he took his name in an XVIII. district primary and sports school youth football base. His legacy has been preserved by the Puskás Academy since 2015. His life novel was published in 1992 as The Bamba, with the subtitle The Greatest Goal King of All Time.

International career
Deák Bamba was also excellent in the national team, playing in 20 matches for the Hungary national team from 1946 to 1949, scoring 29 goals, thus having a ratio of 1.45, which is a world record, being just ahead of Just Fontaine, who scored 30 goals in 21 matches for France for a ratio of 1.43.

He scored 3 hat-tricks for Hungary, including a poker against Bulgaria in the 1947 Balkan Cup, where the Hungarian team beat the Bulgarians 9-0. This 4-goal haul helped him to be the top goal scorer of the 1947 Balkan Cup with 5 goals as Hungary won the tournament in its first attempt. With 9 goals in the Balkan Cup, he is among the all-time top goal scorers in the competition's history. Then, in 1949, the newly appointed coach, Gusztáv Sebes, judged the excellent center to be politically unreliable (the same politic issues that forced him to leave Ferencváros in 1950), so he expelled him from the team and replaced him with Hidegkuti. Bamba was very worn out, as he missed Hungary's Olympic victory at the 1952 Summer Olympics, the match of the century in 1953, the 1954 World Cup which Hungary nearly won and all the successes that made the Hungarian national team the best team in the world for many years.

International goals
Hungary score listed first, score column indicates score after each Deák goal.

Honours

Club
Ferencváros

Nemzeti Bajnokság I:
Champions (1): 1948-49 season

International
Hungary

Balkan Cup:
Champions (1): 1947

Individual

 Hungarian Football Federation Player of the Year: 1946
 Seasonwise World Top Scorer (3): 1945-46, 1946–47, 1948-49
 Hungarian League Top Scorer (3): 1945-46, 1946-47 and 1948-49
 Top goalscorer of the 1947 Balkan Cup with 5 goals.

See also 
 List of men's footballers with 500 or more goals

References

External links
 

1922 births
1998 deaths
Hungarian footballers
Association football forwards
Hungary international footballers
Ferencvárosi TC footballers
Újpest FC players
BFC Siófok players
Burials at Farkasréti Cemetery
Footballers from Budapest